Kattia Garza Romo (born 23 November 1979) is a Mexican politician from the Ecologist Green Party of Mexico. In 2009 she served as Deputy of the LXI Legislature of the Mexican Congress representing Nuevo León.

References

1979 births
Living people
Politicians from Nuevo León
Women members of the Chamber of Deputies (Mexico)
Ecologist Green Party of Mexico politicians
21st-century Mexican politicians
21st-century Mexican women politicians
Deputies of the LXI Legislature of Mexico
Members of the Chamber of Deputies (Mexico) for Nuevo León